Deverra is a genus of flowering plant in the family Apiaceae, native from northern Africa to the Arabian Peninsula and Iraq, and to south tropical and southern Africa. The genus was first described by Augustin de Candolle in 1829.

Species
, Plants of the World Online accepted the following species:
Deverra aphylla (Cham. & Schltdl.) DC.
Deverra battandieri (Maire) Podlech
Deverra burchellii (DC.) Eckl. & Zeyh.
Deverra denudata (Viv.) Pfisterer & Podlech
Deverra juncea Ball
Deverra rapaletsa Magee & Zietsman
Deverra reboudii Coss. & Durieu
Deverra scoparia Coss. & Durieu
Deverra tortuosa (Desf.) DC.
Deverra triradiata Hochst. ex Boiss.

References

Apioideae
Apioideae genera